Jean Laborde (8 March 1922 – 18 January 2022) was a French politician.

Biography
Laborde was born in Bouzon-Gellenave on 8 March 1922 into a family of farmers. During World War II, he participated in the French Resistance. After the war, he became a doctor and later joined the Socialist Party. In 1973, he was elected to the National Assembly in Gers's 1st constituency. In 1977, he was elected mayor of Auch. He retired from politics in 1995.

He died in Auch on 18 January 2022, at the age of 99.

References

1922 births
2022 deaths
People from Gers
French Resistance members
Mayors of places in Occitania (administrative region)
Socialist Party (France) politicians
Deputies of the 5th National Assembly of the French Fifth Republic
Deputies of the 6th National Assembly of the French Fifth Republic
Deputies of the 7th National Assembly of the French Fifth Republic
Deputies of the 8th National Assembly of the French Fifth Republic
Deputies of the 9th National Assembly of the French Fifth Republic